Discoderus robustus is a species of ground beetle in the family Carabidae. It is found in North America.

Subspecies
These two subspecies belong to the species Discoderus robustus:
 Discoderus robustus piceus Casey, 1914
 Discoderus robustus robustus G. Horn, 1883

References

Further reading

 

Harpalinae
Articles created by Qbugbot
Beetles described in 1883